or  refers to Japanese literature of the Heian period, running from 794 to 1185. This article summarizes its history and development.

Overview 
Kanshi (poetry written in Chinese) and kanbun (prose in Chinese) had remained popular since the Nara period, and the influence of the Tang poet Bai Juyi (Haku Kyoi in Japanese) on Japanese kanshi in this period was great. Even in the Tale of Genji, a pure Japanese work composed entirely in kana, particularly in the chapter "Kiritsubo", the influence of his Song of Everlasting Regret has been widely recognized. Sugawara no Michizane, who taught at the Daigaku-ryō before becoming Minister of the Right, was known not only as a politician but as a leading kanshi poet.

In 905, with the imperial order to compile the Kokinshū, the first imperial anthology, waka poetry acquired a status comparable to kanshi. Waka were composed at uta-awase and other official events, and the private collections of well-known poets such as Ki no Tsurayuki (the Tsurayuki-shū) and Lady Ise (the Ise-shū) became well-known.

During this period, since the language of most official documents was Chinese, most men of the nobility used Chinese characters to write poetry and prose in Chinese, but among women the kana syllabary continued to grow in popularity, and more and more men adopted this simpler style of writing as well. Most of the works of literature from the Heian period that are still well-regarded today were written predominantly in kana. Diaries had been written by men in Chinese for some time, but in the early tenth century Ki no Tsurayuki chose to write his Tosa Nikki  from the standpoint of a woman, in kana. Partly due to the Tosa Nikkis influence, diaries written in Japanese became increasingly common.

 Timeline of notable works 
797 – Shoku Nihongi by Fujiwara no Tsuginawa, Sugano no Mamichi et al. (history)
807 - Kogo Shūi by Inbe no Hironari (Inbe clan history) 

814 – Ryōunshū, compiled by Ono no Minemori, Sugawara no Kiyotomo et al. (kanshi anthology)
(genealogy)
818 – Bunka Shūreishū, compiled by Fujiwara no Fuyutsugu, Sugawara no Kiyotomo et al. (kanshi anthology) 
827 – Keikokushū, compiled by Yoshimine no Yasuyo, Sugawara no Kiyotomo et al. (kanshi anthology)
833 - Ryō no gige a commentary of the Yoro code and the source of information that modern scholars use to reconstruct law from the Heian period and Nara period
835 – Shōryōshū by Kūkai (kanshi/kanbun anthology)
841 – Nihon Kōki by Fujiwara no Otsugu et al. (history)
847 - Ennin's Diary 
868 - Ryo no Shuge a private commentary on the yoro codes had no legal effect like Ryō no Gige.  It was written by Naomoto Koremun, a lawyer. Though 50 volumesoriginally, it is  now 35. 
869 – Shoku Nihon Kōki
879 – Toshi Bunshū by Miyako no Yoshika a personal poetry collection but it also includes important imperial documents from his time at court and historical information about Sugawara no Michizane
879 - Hatashi Honkeicho the history of the hata set of shrines there formation submitted to the imperial court. 
879 - Nihon Montoku Tennō Jitsuroku           (history)
891 -  Nihonkoku Genzaisho Mokuroku a book catalog of Chinese books written by Fujiwara no Sukeyo after a fire had destroyed these books. Some of these Chinese books no longer exist today. see List of National Treasures of Japan (writings: Classical Chinese books) for more information on imported books 
892 - Ruijū Kokushi (history) 
900 – Kanke Bunsō by Sugawara no Michizane (kanshi/kanbun anthology)
901 - Nihon Sandai Jitsuroku (history) 
903 - Kanke Kōshū by Sugawara no Michizane  (kanshi/kanbun anthology) written before his death while in exile and was shown to Ki no Haseo after being sent 
905 – Kokin Wakashū - compiled by Ki no Tsurayuki, Ki no Tomonori, Ōshikōchi no Mitsune and Mibu no Tadamine on the orders of Emperor Daigo (chokusen wakashū) 
Before 910 – Taketori Monogatari (author unknown; monogatari) 
913 - Shinsen Manyoshu 
927 - Engishiki 
935 – Tosa Nikki  by Ki no Tsurayuki (diary)
939 - Teishinkoki 
(date unknown) - Ise Monogatari  (uta monogatari)
951 - Gosen Wakashū 
951 - Yamato monogatari
952 - Heichu Monogatari
962 - Tonomine Shosho Monogatari
972 - Toyokage Moogatari 
973 - Shinsen Kisoki the first text of Japanese turtle shell divination completed in 973 but was compiled through 830. 
974 - Kagerō Nikki 
975 - Ochikubo Monogatari

 Before 977 – Utsubo Monogatari by Unknown
 977 - Honin no Jiju Shu
 980 - Sumiyoshi Monogatari it was a highly influential book read by Murasaki Shikibu and Sei Shōnagon
 982 - Chiteiki
 984 - Sanpo-e 
 984 - Zokusajosho the history of the Daijo-kan inherited by Otsuki. It compiles years 984 until the 7th year of the Genroku period of the Edo period.  It has some 270 documents. 
 991 - Fujiwara no Sari hitsu shojō a letter by Fujiwara no sari 
 999 - Sanekata Shu Fujiwara no sanekata's personal poetry collection.  
1002 – The Pillow Book  by Sei Shōnagon ('zuihitsu)
1004 - Izumi Shikibu Nikki  by Izumi Shikibu a poetic diary 
1005 - Shūi Wakashū 
1008 – The Tale of Genji by Murasaki Shikibu (tsukuri-monogatari)
1008 - Political affairs summary a book detailing political affairs, it was completed in 1002 when Emperor Ichijo was ruling and updated until 1008. It was written by Tadasuke Koremune at the request of Fujiwara no Sanesuke out of 130 volumes 26 remain. 
1010 - Murasaki Shikibu Nikki
1011 - Ruiju - Sandaikaku a collection of laws, a compilation of the lost Engi Kyaku.  The author is unknown but Engi Kyaku is said to have been written by Tokihira Fujiwara as the head of editing. 
1012 - Shinsen Zuinō by Fujiwara no kinto
1012 - Waka Kuhon by Fujiwara no kinto 
1013 - Wakan rōeishū
1017 - Gonki  a diary by Fujiwara no Yukinari
1020 – Sarashina Nikki  by Takasue's daughter
1021 - Midō Kanpakuki the diary of Fujiwara no Michinaga
1030 - Gengenshu by Nōin  
1031 - Hosshin Wakashu  
1032 - shoyuki by Fujiwara no Sanesuke
1043 - Hokke Genki 
1047 - Enoshima engi
1050 - Sakuteiki (the first garden manual)
1050 - Nōin Utamakura by Nōin 
1055 - tsutsumi chunagon monogatari a book of short stories 
1059 - Yoru no Nezame
1060 - Hamamatsu Chunagon Monogatari
1061 - Sagami-shū by sagami 
1065 - Shinsarugakuki a book presumed to been written by Fujiwara no Akihira.  It is a book full of customs and possibly a biographical account but is often regarded as a work of fiction.  It lists general references to each trade of Japan from performers of sarugaku to farmers. 
1065 - Meigo Orai a book of model letters by Fujiwara no Akihira. 
1076 - Sagoromo Monogatari
1081 - Suisaki a diary by Minamoto no Toshifusa 
1086 - Goshūi Wakashū 
1094 - Ruijufusensho a collection of laws. Tsuneyori Minamoto is said to have written it. 
1099 -  Go-Nijō Donoki (Moromichi Diary) a diary by Fujiwara no Moromichi
1100 - Rōei gōchū a commentary on the Wakan rōeishū by Ōe no Masafusa
1105 - Konjaku Monogatarish
1107 - Eiga Monogatari  
1109 - Honchō shinsenden by Ōe no Masafusa
1109 - Sanuki no suke Nikki the diary of Sanuki no suke 
1110 - Nezame monogatari emaki 
1113 - Nishi Honganji Sanju-rokunin Kashu 
1113 - ise Nikki  
1113 - Saigū no Nyōgo Shū 
1113 - Okikaze-shū 

1120 – Ōkagami (author unknown; rekishi monogatari)
1120 – Konjaku Monogatarishū (compiler unknown; setsuwa anthology)
1127 – Kin'yō Wakashū, compiled by Minamoto no Toshiyori (chokusen wakashū)
1131 - Kohon Setsuwashu a recently discovered setsuwa (that was lost )
1133 - Hosouruirin''' a book of laws written by shinsai 4 volumes remain out of 230 
1140 - Genji Monogatari Emaki
1142 - Kikki a diary by Tsunefusa yoshida (started in 1142 finished in 1200)
1144 - rin'yō wakashū a personal collection by Shun'e
1146 - Myobokanyosho a law book compiled and edited from old law books supposedly written by a monk named megumi1150 - Chōjū-jinbutsu-giga1150 - Kibi Daijin Nittō Emaki 
1150 - Gaki-zoshi at the Kyoto National Museum
1150 - Jigokuzōji Hell scroll at the Nara National Museum1150 - Hekija-E (Extermination of Evil) 
1150 - Jigoku-zoshi Hell Scroll at the Tokyo National Museum 
1151 – Shika Wakashū, compiled by Fujiwara no Akisuke (chokusen wakashū)
1151 - Sankaiki a diary by Nakayama Tadachika (started 1151 ended 1194)
1156 - Hogen monogatari1157 - Shigisan Engi Emaki 
1158 - Nenju gyōji emaki 
1159 - Honcho Seiki (history) 
1160 - heiji monogatari
1161 - Kirei Mondō a manual for writing letters by Nakayama Tadachika
1164 - Gyokuyo a diary by Kanezane kujo (started in 1164 finished in 1200)
1164 - Fujiwara no Tadamichi hitsushojōan a set of 25 letters by Fujiwara no Tadamichi said to be a manual for writing letters. 
1165 - Kara monogatari a collection of tales from China   
1169 - Fusō Ryakuki 
1170 –Imakagami by Fujiwara no Tametsune (rekishi monogatari)
1170 - Torikaebaya Monogatari 1178 - Takakura tennō shinkan goshōsoku a letter by emperor takakura 1178 - Seigan-ji urabon engi a history of the ghost festival scroll 
1180 - Takakura-in Itsukushima Gokōki  a travel diary by Minamoto no Michichika 
1180 - Saigyo Poems of a Mountain Home 
1180 - Ryōjin Hishō
1181 - Kojijū-shū1181 - Takakura-in Shōkaki a diary by  Minamoto no michichika mourning the death of emperor takakura 
1182 - Nijōin no Sanuki Shū1183 - Kokawa-dera Engi Emaki 1184 - Ban Dainagon Ekotoba 1184 - Nijō Taikō Taigōgū no Daini shu 
1185 - heike monogatari 
1185 - takamura monogatari 

1188 – Senzai Wakashū, compiled by Fujiwara no Shunzei on the command of Emperor Go-Shirakawa in 1183 it started to be compiled (chokusen-wakashū'')

Notes

History of literature in Japan
Late Old Japanese texts